Linney is an English surname. Notable people with the surname include:

Caitlin Linney, American trance vocalist and singer-songwriter
Dave Linney (born 1961), English footballer
George Linney (1869–1927), English-born Australian cricketer, father of Keith Linney
Keith Linney (1912–1992), Australian-born English cricketer
Laura Linney (born 1964), American actress of film, television and theatre
Romulus Linney (playwright) (born 1930), American playwright and professor
Romulus Zachariah Linney (1841–1910), Republican U.S. Congressman from North Carolina 1895–1901

See also
 Linney (linny, linhay) is also a type of farm storage building with an open side and an unusual form: circular linhay
Lunney

English-language surnames
Surnames of British Isles origin